, abbreviated VLA, is a Mexican morning television program aired on the Azteca Uno network (formerly Azteca Trece). It began broadcasting on January 2, 2006, and features segments on entertainment, health and beauty, cooking, and other topics.

History
VLA first appeared on January 2, 2006, as a replacement for the similarly formatted Cada mañana. Two of its original hosts, Ingrid Coronado and Ana La Salvia, had previously been on Cada mañana: they were joined by Argentine-Mexican presenter Fernando del Solar.

References

External links
 

2006 television series debuts
Mexican television talk shows
Television series by TV Azteca
Azteca Uno original programming